Ross Green (born 3 January 1978 in Falkirk) is a British former alpine skier who competed in the 2002 Winter Olympics.

References

1978 births
Living people
Sportspeople from Falkirk
Scottish male alpine skiers
Olympic alpine skiers of Great Britain
Alpine skiers at the 2002 Winter Olympics